William Henry Ray (December 14, 1812 – January 25, 1881) was an American politician. He served as a member of the United States House of Representatives from Illinois.

Biography 
Born on December 14, 1812 in Amenia, New York. Ray moved to Oneida County, New York, in 1813 with his parents who settled in Utica. He attended the common schools. 

He moved to Rushville, Illinois, in 1834. In 1849, he purchased the home at 417 West Washington Street in Rushville, IL.  Ray hosted his personal friend Abraham Lincoln at the home for an overnight stay before Mr. Lincoln's public address in Rushville in October 1858.  Today the home is owned by the Schuyler County Architecture Foundation and is still known as the Ray House. A capital campaign for the full restoration of the Ray House by the Schuyler County Architecture Foundation is currently underway. In May 2019, the Ray House was added to the list of the 12 most endangered historic places in the State of Illinois.

He engaged in mercantile pursuits. He was also interested in banking. He served as member of the first State Board of Equalization 1867–1869.

Ray was elected as a Republican to the Forty-third Congress (March 4, 1873–March 3, 1875). 

He resumed his former business pursuits in Rushville, Illinois, and died there January 25, 1881. He was interred in Rushville Cemetery.

Family 
He had been married twice. His brother in-law was R. C. Chambers, a politician and businessperson.

References

External links
 

1812 births
1881 deaths
Republican Party members of the United States House of Representatives from Illinois
People from Rushville, Illinois
19th-century American politicians
People from Amenia, New York
Politicians from Utica, New York